is a Japanese footballer currently playing as a defender for FC Imabari.

Club career
Ichihara made his professional debut in a 1–3 Emperor's Cup loss against Kyoto Sanga.

Career statistics

Club
.

Notes

References

1998 births
Living people
People from Machida, Tokyo
Association football people from Tokyo
Toyo University alumni
Japanese footballers
Association football defenders
FC Imabari players